Ronald Joseph Suster (born October 31, 1942) is a retired American lawyer who served in the Ohio House of Representatives from 1981 until 1995, and as a judge in Cuyahoga County from 1995 until 2012.

Early life and education

Ronald Joseph Suster was born on October 31, 1942, in Cleveland, Ohio, to Joseph Suster, Jr. (1909-1959) and Frances Pryatel (1906-1997). His grandparents were first-generation immigrants from Slovenia. He attended Villa Angela–St. Joseph High School, a Catholic college-preparatory school in North Collinwood, Cleveland, and was later inducted into its Hall of Fame in 1992.

Suster attended Western Reserve University, receiving a Bachelor of Arts degree in history and economics in 1964. He then earned a Doctorate of Jurisprudence from Case Western Reserve Law School in 1967. He was admitted to the Ohio State Bar in 1967, and was in private general practice from 1970 until he became a judge in 1995.

Suster is a member of the Ohio State Bar Association. He served as an Assistant Ohio Attorney General from 1971 to 1980, under William J. Brown.

Career in government
Suster was elected to the 114th Ohio House of Representatives in 1980 as a member of the Democratic Party, representing the 18th district. He took his seat in 1981. He was re-elected in 1982 representing the 19th district, due to redistricting after the 1980 United States census. He retained that seat until 1993, when he won election in the 14th district. During his tenure in the House of Representatives, he served as chairman of four House committees: House Ethics (1983–84), Civil & Commercial Law (1985–86), Financial Institutions (1987–90), and Judiciary & Criminal Justice (1993–94). All four districts he served in were located in eastern Cuyahoga County.
In 1995, he resigned from the House of Representatives when he was appointed to the Cuyahoga County Court of Common Pleas by Governor George Voinovich. He was a judge in the court's General Division until his mandatory retirement at age 70 in 2012, though he occasionally was assigned to adjudicate further cases.

Suster was the Democratic candidate in the 1998 Ohio Supreme Court election. He received 781,103 votes, but lost to the incumbent Republican Paul Pfeifer (who received 1,947,916 votes).

Personal life
Suster married Patricia Hocevar on July 19, 1974 at St. Paschal Baylon Parish in Highland Heights, Ohio. They have three children and seven grandchildren.

Notes

References

Democratic Party members of the Ohio House of Representatives
Living people
Case Western Reserve University alumni
1942 births